Anguilla is a British Overseas Territory in the Caribbean. It is one of the most northerly of the Leeward Islands in the Lesser Antilles, lying east of Puerto Rico and the Virgin Islands and directly north of Saint Martin. The territory's capital is The Valley.

Etymology
The native Arawak name for the island was Malliouhana.

In reference to the island's shape, the Italian , meaning "eel"  (in turn, from the Latin diminutive of anguis, "snake") was used as its name.

History 

Anguilla was first settled by Indigenous Amerindian peoples who migrated from South America. The earliest Native American artefacts found on Anguilla have been dated to around 1300 BC; remains of settlements date from AD 600.
There are two known petroglyph sites in Anguilla: Big Spring and Fountain Cavern. The rock ledges of Big Spring contain over 100 petroglyphs (dating back to AD 600-1200), the majority consisting of three indentations that form faces.

Precisely when Anguilla was first seen by Europeans is uncertain: some sources claim that Columbus sighted the island during his second voyage in 1493, while others state that the first European explorer was the French Huguenot nobleman and merchant René Goulaine de Laudonnière in 1564. The Dutch West India Company established a fort on the island in 1631.  However, the Company later withdrew after its fort was destroyed by the Spanish in 1633.

Traditional accounts state that Anguilla was first colonised by English settlers from Saint Kitts beginning in 1650. The settlers focused on planting tobacco, and to a lesser extent cotton. The French temporarily took over the island in 1666 but returned it to English control under the terms of the Treaty of Breda the next year. Major John Scott who visited in September 1667, wrote of leaving the island "in good condition" and noted that in July 1668, "200 or 300 people fled thither in time of war". The French attacked again in 1688, 1745 and 1798, causing much destruction but failing to capture the island.

It is likely that the early European settlers brought enslaved Africans with them. Historians confirm that African slaves lived in the region in the early 17th century, such as slaves from Senegal living on St Kitts in the mid-1600s. By 1672 a slave depot existed on the island of Nevis, serving the Leeward Islands. While the time of African arrival in Anguilla is difficult to place precisely, archival evidence indicates a substantial African presence of at least 100 enslaved people by 1683; these seem to have come from Central Africa as well as West Africa. The slaves were forced to work on the sugar plantations which had begun to replace tobacco as Anguilla's main crop. Over time the African slaves and their descendants came to vastly outnumber the white settlers. The African slave trade was eventually terminated within the British Empire in 1807, and slavery outlawed completely in 1834. Many planters subsequently sold up or left the island.

During the early colonial period, Anguilla was administered by the British through Antigua; in 1825, it was placed under the administrative control of nearby Saint Kitts. Anguilla was federated with St Kitts and Nevis in 1882, against the wishes of many Anguillans. Economic stagnation, and the severe effects of several droughts in the 1890s and later the Great Depression of the 1930s led many Anguillans to emigrate for better prospects elsewhere.

Full adult suffrage was introduced to Anguilla in 1952. After a brief period as part of the West Indies Federation (1958–62), the island of Anguilla became part of the associated state of Saint Kitts-Nevis-Anguilla with full internal autonomy in 1967. However many Anguillans had no wish to be a part of this union, and resented the dominance of St Kitts within it. On 30 May 1967 Anguillans forcibly ejected the St Kitts police force from the island and declared their separation from St Kitts following a referendum. The events, led by Atlin Harrigan and Ronald Webster among others, became known as the Anguillan Revolution; its goal was not independence per se, but rather independence from Saint Kitts and Nevis and a return to being a British colony.

With negotiations failing to break the deadlock, a second referendum confirming Anguillans' desire for separation from St Kitts was held and the Republic of Anguilla was declared unilaterally, with Ronald Webster as president. Efforts by British envoy William Whitlock failed to break the impasse and 300 British troops were subsequently sent in March 1969. British authority was restored, and confirmed by the Anguilla Act of July 1971. In 1980, Anguilla was finally allowed to formally secede from Saint Kitts and Nevis and become a separate British Crown colony (now a British overseas territory). Since then, Anguilla has been politically stable, and has seen a large growth in its tourism and offshore financing sectors.

Geography and geology 

Anguilla is a flat, low-lying island of coral and limestone in the Caribbean Sea, measuring some 16 miles (26 km) long and 3.5 miles (6 km) in width. It lies to the east of Puerto Rico and the Virgin Islands and directly north of Saint Martin, separated from that island by the Anguilla Channel. The soil is generally thin and poor, supporting scrub, tropical and forest vegetation.

Anguilla is noted for its ecologically important coral reefs and beaches. Apart from the main island of Anguilla itself, the territory includes a number of other smaller islands and cays, mostly tiny and uninhabited:
 Anguillita
 Blowing Rock
 Dog Island
 Little Scrub Island
 Prickly Pear Cays
 Scrub Island
 Seal Island
 Sombrero, also known as Hat Island
 Sandy Island
 Scilly Cay

Geology

Anguilla (and the wider Anguilla Bank) is of volcanic origin, lying on the Lesser Antilles volcanic island arc, and tuffs and volcaniclastic breccias of Eocene age are exposed locally on the island. The island was largely submerged during the Miocene, leading to the formation of the reefal limestone Anguilla Formation, which was subsequently tectonically uplifted and cover most of the island today. Since the late Pleistocene, however, Anguilla has undergone tectonic subsidence at a rate of around 1-2mm/yr.

Climate

Temperature
Northeastern trade winds keep this tropical island relatively cool and dry. July–October is its hottest period, December–February, its coolest.

Rainfall
Rainfall averages  annually, although the figures vary from season to season and year to year. The island is subject to both sudden tropical storms and hurricanes, which occur in the period from July to November. The island suffered damage in 1995 from Hurricane Luis and severe flooding  from Hurricane Lenny in 1999.

Governance

Political system

Anguilla is an internally self-governing overseas territory of the United Kingdom. Its politics take place in a framework of a parliamentary representative democratic dependency, whereby the Premier is the head of government, and of a pluriform multi-party system.

The United Nations Committee on Decolonization includes Anguilla on the United Nations list of non-self-governing territories. The territory's constitution is the Anguilla Constitutional Order 1 April 1982 (amended 1990). Executive power is exercised by the government, with legislative power being vested in both the government and the House of Assembly. The judiciary is independent of the executive and the legislature.

Defence
As a British overseas territory, the UK is responsible for Anguilla's military defence, although there are no active garrisons or armed forces present in the territory. Since 2020, the Royal Navy has forward-deployed the offshore patrol vessel HMS Medway long-term to the Caribbean for patrol and sovereignty protection duties.

Anguilla had a small marine police force, comprising around 32 personnel, which operated one VT Halmatic M160-class 52-foot fast patrol boat. Policing on the island is the responsibility of the Royal Anguilla Police Force.

Population

Demographics 

The majority of residents (90.08%) are black, most of whom are the descendants of enslaved people transported from Africa. Minorities include whites at 3.74% and people of mixed race at 4.65% (figures from 2001 census).

72% of the population is Anguillan while 28% is non-Anguillan (2001 census). Of the non-Anguillan population, many are citizens of the United States, United Kingdom, St Kitts & Nevis, the Dominican Republic, Jamaica and Nigeria.

2006 and 2007 saw an influx of large numbers of Chinese, Indian and Mexican workers, brought in as labour for major tourist developments due to the local population not being large enough to support the labour requirements.

Religion 
Christian churches did not have a consistent or strong presence during the initial period of English colonisation; spiritual and religious practices of Europeans and Africans tended to reflect their regional origins. As early as 1813, Christian ministers formally ministered to enslaved Africans and promoted literacy among converts. The Wesleyan (Methodist) Missionary Society of England built churches and schools from 1817.

According to the 2001 census, Christianity is Anguilla's predominant religion, with 29% of the population practising Anglicanism; another 23.9% are Methodist. Other churches on the island include Seventh-day Adventist, Baptist, Roman Catholic (served by the Diocese of Saint John's–Basseterre, with the See at Saint John on Antigua and Barbuda) and a small community of Jehovah's Witnesses (0.7%). Between 1992 and 2001, the number of followers of the Church of God and Pentecostals increased considerably. There are at least 15 churches on the island. Although a minority on the island, Anguilla is an important location to followers of Rastafarian religion as the birthplace of Robert Athlyi Rogers, author of the Holy Piby which had a strong influence on Rastafarian and other Africa-centre belief systems. More recently, a Muslim cultural centre has opened on the island.

Languages 

Today most people in Anguilla speak a British-influenced variety of standard English. Other languages are also spoken on the island, including varieties of Spanish, Chinese and the languages of other immigrant communities. However, the most common language other than Standard English is the island's own English-lexifier Creole language (not to be confused with Antillean Creole ('French Creole'), spoken in French islands such as Martinique and Guadeloupe). It is referred to locally by terms such as "dialect" (pronounced "dialek"), Anguilla Talk or "Anguillian". It has its main roots in early varieties of English and West African languages, and is similar to the dialects spoken in English-speaking islands throughout the Eastern Caribbean in terms of its structural features.

Linguists who are interested in the origins of Anguillan and other Caribbean Creoles point out that some of its grammatical features can be traced to African languages while others can be traced to European languages. Three areas have been identified as significant for the identification of the linguistic origins of those forced migrants who arrived before 1710: the Gold Coast, the Slave Coast and the Windward Coast.

Sociohistorical information from Anguilla's archives suggest that Africans and Europeans formed two distinct, but perhaps overlapping speech communities in the early phases of the island's colonisation. "Anguillian" is believed to have emerged as the language of the masses as time passed, slavery was abolished and locals began to see themselves as "belonging" to Anguillan society.

Education 

There are six government primary schools, one government secondary school (Albena Lake Hodge Comprehensive School), and two private schools. There is a single library, the Edison L. Hughes Education & Library Complex of the Anguilla Public Library. A branch of the Saint James School of Medicine was established in 2011 in Anguilla. It is a private, for-profit medical school headquartered in Park Ridge, Illinois.

There is a University of the West Indies Open campus site in the island.

Culture 

The island's cultural history begins with the native Taino, Arawak and Carib. Their artifacts have been found around the island, telling of life before European settlers arrived.

Anguillan culture has also been built through immigration. Many European families have moved to the island and have impacted the formalities of the Anguillan people. Restaurants such as Dolce Vita and Roy’s Bayside Grill, located in Meads Bay, represent the European culture assimilating within the island.

Similar to nearby islands, Anguillans geography and location require a cultural reliance on the ocean. The island’s abundance of sea life has led to the incorporation of many fish and crustacean into daily life. They have become a part of the local cuisine, opened up opportunities for ecotourism, and introduced celebrations such as Lobster Fest and boat races.

As throughout the Caribbean, holidays are a cultural fixture. Anguilla's most important holidays are of historic as much as cultural importance – particularly the anniversary of the emancipation (previously August Monday in the Park), celebrated as the Summer Festival, or Carnival,the sailboat races, and Lobster Fest. British festivities, such as the King's Birthday, are also celebrated.

Music in Anguilla presents itself as an important part of its culture as well. All different genres of music are played at the celebrations mentioned above. This music represents the deep history of talent that Anguillans have displayed for decades.

The Anguilla National Trust (ANT) was established in 1989 and opened its current office in 1991 charged with the responsibility of preserving the heritage of the island, including its cultural heritage.

Cuisine 

Anguillan cuisine is influenced by native Caribbean, African, Spanish, French, and English cuisines. Seafood is abundant, including prawns, shrimp, crab, spiny lobster, conch, mahi-mahi, red snapper, marlin, and grouper. Salt cod is a staple food eaten on its own and used in stews, casseroles and soups. Livestock is limited due to the small size of the island and people there use poultry, pork, goat, and mutton, along with imported beef. Goat is the most commonly eaten meat, used in a variety of dishes. The official national food of Anguilla is pigeon peas and rice.

A significant amount of the island's produce is imported due to limited land suitable for agriculture production; much of the soil is sandy and infertile. The agriculture produce of Anguilla includes tomatoes, peppers, limes and other citrus fruits, onion, garlic, squash, pigeon peas, and callaloo. Starch staple foods include imported rice and other foods that are imported or locally grown, including yams, sweet potatoes and breadfruit.

Literature
The Anguilla National Trust has programmes encouraging Anguillan writers and the preservation of the island's history. In 2015, Where I See The Sun – Contemporary Poetry in Anguilla A New Anthology by Lasana M. Sekou was published by House of Nehesi Publishers. Among the forty three poets in the collection are Rita Celestine-Carty, Bankie Banx, John T. Harrigan, Patricia J. Adams, Fabian Fahie, Dr. Oluwakemi Linda Banks, and Reuel Ben Lewi.

Music 

Various Caribbean musical genres are popular on the island, such as soca and calypso, but reggae most deeply roots itself in Anguillan society. Anguilla has produced many artists and groups in this genre.

Reggae has shown itself to be the most popular genre in Anguilla. The most successful of reggae artists originating in Anguilla come from the Banks family. Bankie “Banx” and his son Omari Banks have had many chart-topping songs listened to around the world. The two musicians continue to provide live performances across the island quite often.

British Dependency has also gained popularity throughout the 21st century. The band, who began in Anguilla, boasts the island’s first female bass player. Performing alongside The Wailers on tour, British Dependency have earned attention from an American audience.

One of many musical events that take place in Anguilla is Moonsplash. Moonsplash is an annual reggae music festival that has occurred in Anguilla for 33 consecutive years and proves to be the oldest independent musical event in the Caribbean. Along with its longstanding history, it is the largest festival annually alongside carnival.

While not many soca and calypso artists have gained extreme popularity, the genres are still widely listened to across the island.

Sports 

Boat racing has deep roots in Anguillan culture and is the national sport. There are regular sailing regattas on national holidays, such as Carnival, which are contested by locally built and designed boats. These boats have names and have sponsors that print their logo on their sails.

As in many other former British colonies, cricket is also a popular sport. Anguilla is the home of Omari Banks, who played for the West Indies Cricket Team, while Cardigan Connor played first-class cricket for English county side Hampshire and was 'chef de mission' (team manager) for Anguilla's Commonwealth Games team in 2002. Other noted players include Chesney Hughes, who played for Derbyshire County Cricket Club in England.

Rugby union is represented in Anguilla by the Anguilla Eels RFC, who were formed in April 2006. The Eels have been finalists in the St. Martin tournament in November 2006 and semi-finalists in 2007, 2008, 2009 and Champions in 2010. The Eels were formed in 2006 by Scottish club national second row Martin Welsh, Club Sponsor and President of the AERFC Ms. Jacquie Ruan, and Canadian standout Scrumhalf Mark Harris (Toronto Scottish RFC).

Anguilla is the birthplace of sprinter Zharnel Hughes who has represented Great Britain since 2015, and England at the 2018 Commonwealth Games. He won the 100 metres at the 2018 European Athletics Championships, the 4 x 100 metres at the same championships, and the 4 x 100 metres for England at the 2018 Commonwealth Games. He also won a  relay team gold at the 2022 Birmingham Commonwealth Games and a silver on the  relay for Great Britain at the 2020 Olympic Games.

Shara Proctor, British Long Jump Silver Medalist in World Championships in Beijing first represented Anguilla in the event until 2010 when she began to represent Great Britain and England. Under the Anguillan Flag she achieved several medals in the NACAC games.

Keith Connor, triple jumper, is also an Anguillan. He represented Great Britain and England and achieved several international titles including Commonwealth and European Games gold medals and an Olympic bronze medal. Keith later became Head Coach of Australia Athletics.

Natural history

Wildlife

Anguilla has habitat for the Cuban tree frogs (Osteopilus septentrionalis). The red-footed tortoise (Chelonoidis carbonaria) is a species of tortoise found here, which originally came from South America. Hurricanes in the mid-90s led to over-water dispersal of the green iguanas (Iguana iguana) to Anguilla. All three animals are introductions.

Five species of bats are known in the literature from Anguilla – the threatened insular single leaf bat (Monophyllus plethodon), the Antillean fruit-eating bat (Brachyphylla cavernarum), the Jamaican fruit bat (Artibeus jamaicensis), the Mexican funnel-eared bat (Natalus stramineus), and the velvety free-tailed bat (Molossus molossus).

Notable people

Kelvin Liddie (born 1981), Anguillan football player
Carlos Newton, former UFC Welterweight Champion
Shara Proctor, longjump athlete
Zharnel Hughes , sprinter

Economy 

Anguilla's thin arid soil being largely unsuitable for agriculture, the island has few land-based natural resources. Its main industries are tourism, offshore incorporation and management, offshore banking, captive insurance and fishing.

Anguilla's currency is the East Caribbean dollar, though the US dollar is also widely accepted. The exchange rate is fixed to the US dollar at US$1 = EC$2.70.

The economy, and especially the tourism sector, suffered a setback in late 1995 due to the effects of Hurricane Luis in September. Hotels were hit particularly hard but a recovery occurred the following year. Another economic setback occurred during the aftermath of Hurricane Lenny in 2000. Before the 2008 worldwide crisis, the economy of Anguilla was growing strongly, especially the tourism sector, which was driving major new developments in partnerships with multi-national companies. Anguilla's tourism industry received a major boost when it was selected to host the World Travel Awards in December 2014. Known as "the Oscars of the travel industry", the awards ceremony was held at the CuisinArt Resort and Spa and was hosted by Vivica A. Fox. Anguilla was voted the World's Leading Luxury Island Destination from a short list of top-tier candidates such as St. Barts, the Maldives, and Mauritius.

Anguilla's financial system comprises seven banks, two money services businesses, more than 40 company managers, more than 50 insurers, 12 brokers, more than 250 captive intermediaries, more than 50 mutual funds, and eight trust companies.

Anguilla has become a popular tax haven, having no capital gains, estate, profit, sales, or corporate taxes. In April 2011, faced with a mounting deficit, it introduced a 3% "Interim Stabilisation Levy", Anguilla's first form of income tax. Anguilla also has a 0.75% property tax.

Anguilla aims to obtain 15% of its energy from solar power to become less reliant on expensive imported diesel. The Climate & Development Knowledge Network is helping the government gather the information it needs to change the territory's legislation, so that it can integrate renewables into its grid. Barbados has also made good progress in switching to renewables, but many other Small Island Developing States are still at the early stages of planning how to integrate renewable energy into their grids. "For a small island we're very far ahead," said Beth Barry, Coordinator of the Anguilla Renewable Energy Office. "We've got an Energy Policy and a draft Climate Change policy and have been focusing efforts on the question of sustainable energy supply for several years now. As a result, we have a lot of information we can share with other islands."

Transportation

Air
Anguilla is served by Clayton J. Lloyd International Airport (prior to 4 July 2010 known as Wallblake Airport). Regional scheduled passenger services connect to various other Caribbean islands via local airlines.

In December 2021 Anguilla inaugurated its first ever international regular commercial jet service flight to and from the mainland U.S. American Eagle operating on behalf of American Airlines began nonstop Embraer 175 regional jet service to Anguilla from Miami in an aviation watershed moment for Anguilla with the airport also currently attempting to attract other international air carriers.

Other airlines currently serving the airport include Tradewind Aviation and Cape Air which provide scheduled air service to San Juan, Puerto Rico.  Several other small airlines serve the airport as well.

The airport can handle large narrow-body jets such as the Boeing 737 and Airbus A320 and has growing private jet service flights with a new private jet terminal being built.

Road
Aside from taxis, there is no public transport on the island. Cars drive on the left.

Boat
There are regular ferries from Saint Martin to Anguilla. It is a 20-minute crossing from Marigot, St. Martin to Blowing Point, Anguilla. Ferries commence service from 7:00 am. There is also a charter service, from Blowing Point, Anguilla to Princess Juliana Airport to make travel easier. This way of travel is the most common method of transport between Anguilla and St. Martin.

See also 

 Bibliography of Anguilla
 Outline of Anguilla
 Index of Anguilla-related articles

References

Further reading 
 
 
 .
 
 .
 
 Harris, David R. - Plants, Animals and Man in the Outer Leeward Islands, West Indies. An Ecological Study of Antigua, Barbuda, and Anguilla.

External links

Government
 Government of Anguilla—Official government website

General information
 Anguilla. The World Factbook. Central Intelligence Agency.
 Anguilla from UCB Libraries GovPubs
 
 battle for freedom -- youtube video compilation archived at Ghostarchive.org on 18 May 2022

 
Dependent territories in the Caribbean
.Anguilla
Leeward Islands (Caribbean)
English-speaking countries and territories
Island countries
Former English colonies
British Leeward Islands
British West Indies
Member states of the Organisation of Eastern Caribbean States
States and territories established in 1980
Small Island Developing States
1650 establishments in the British Empire
1650 establishments in North America
1650s establishments in the Caribbean
States and territories established in 1650